This article contains a list of the current and past Michelin starred restaurants in Portugal. As of 2021, there are 28 starred restaurants in the country: 21 one-star and 7 two-star establishments.

Restaurant list

See also
 Michelin Guide
 List of Michelin 3-star restaurants
 Lists of restaurants

References 

Michelin starred restaurants in Portugal

Michelin